Sean Robert Wharton (born 31 October 1968) is a Welsh former professional footballer who played as a forward for Sunderland.

References

1968 births
Living people
Footballers from Newport, Wales
Welsh people of Jamaican descent
British sportspeople of Jamaican descent
Welsh footballers
Association football forwards
Sunderland A.F.C. players
Cwmbrân Town A.F.C. players
Inter Cardiff F.C. players
Weston-super-Mare A.F.C. players
English Football League players